The Squad is a 1981 Australian television film about a squad of detectives. It was the pilot for a series that was never made, intended to be a replacement for the TV show Skyways.

References

Australian television films
1981 television films
1981 films
1980s English-language films